Pindara or Pandu Pindara 
Temple is situated at Pindara village about 6.5 km from Jind, Haryana, India.

History
According to a legend, the Pandavas offered here pinds to their forefathers and hence the name of the village is Pandu Pindara. A fair is held on Somavati Amavas. This place is also called Som Tirath.

References

Hindu temples in Haryana